Bharadkhol is a coastal village in the Shrivardhan Taluk in Raigad District in Maharashtra State, India. It is close to popular beach town of Diveagar known for its pristine beach.

References 

Villages in Raigad district